The range of area codes 800-899 in Mexico is reserved for Coahuila, Durango, Nuevo León, San Luis Potosí, Tamaulipas and Veracruz.

(For other areas, see Area codes in Mexico by code).

8